Composition with Grid No. 1 or Composition in Grey and Ochre is a 1918 painting by the Dutch artist Piet Mondrian. It is currently in the collection of the Museum of Fine Arts, Houston.

Background
In 1917, Mondrian was one of the founding members of the Dutch art group De Stijl ("The Style"), an abstract movement which sought unification of material and spiritual worlds through pure geometry. Composition with Grid No. 1, painted in 1918, was an early painting to adopt this style. The Dutch art historian Carel Blotkamp hypothesizes that this painting is one of Mondrian's first to use a modular or grid-like system. Later X-ray photography corroborates this, revealing that Mondrian sketched an underlying grid pattern of uniform rectangles based on the golden ratio. Mondrian continued to use grid patterns in his work, even in his final compositions Broadway Boogie Woogie and Victory Boogie Woogie.

Description
Mondrian drew the underlying modular system onto the canvas in charcoal. He then used dark grey oil paints to delineate rectangular areas of varying sizes on this grid. Thus, the painting's visible rectangles are superimposed on the underlying grid, giving what the Museum of Fine Arts, Houston, describes as "an exceptional harmony of proportion". These rectangles were then painted in gray and ochre colors.

Mondrian signed and dated the painting in the lower left with the inscription "PM 18".

Exhibition and provenance 
The painting was on display in an exhibition organized by the Hollandsche Kunstenaarskring ("Dutch Artists' Circle") in the Stedelijk Museum in Amsterdam in 1919. In 1960, the painting was purchased by Mr. and Mrs. Pierre Schlumberger before being donated to the Museum of Fine Arts, Houston, in 1963, where it is currently housed.

In research
A paper by Li et al., published in 2013, sought to model human aesthetic judgement. One of the paintings selected for the experiments was Mondrian's Composition with Grid No. 1, alongside the artist's Composition No. 10 (1939–1942) and Composition with Yellow, Blue, and Red (1937–1942).

References

Sources

External links
 

1918 paintings
Paintings by Piet Mondrian
Paintings in the collection of the Museum of Fine Arts, Houston